The Institute of Molecular Biotechnology (IMBA) is an independent biomedical research organisation founded by the Austrian Academy of Sciences in cooperation with the pharmaceutical company Boehringer Ingelheim. The institute employs around 250 people from over 40 countries, who perform basic research. IMBA is located at the Vienna BioCenter (VBC) and shares facilities and scientific training programs with the Gregor Mendel Institute of Molecular Plant Biology (GMI) of the Austrian Academy of Sciences and the Research Institute of Molecular Pathology (IMP), the basic research center of Boehringer Ingelheim.

Research
The research at IMBA aims to understand the fundamental molecular biological processes underlying the 3D architecture of genomes, the functions of small RNAs, and the in vitro reconstitution from stem cells of whole organs and embryos.

The institute comprises 15 research groups (as of December 2022):

 Stefan Ameres (adjunct group): Mechanism and biology of RNA silencing. Developer of the SLAMseq technology.
 Julius Brennecke: Transposon silencing & heterochromatin formation by small RNAs. Pioneer in the discovery of the piRNA/Piwi pathway.
 Alejandro Burga: Molecular determinants of biological idiosyncrasy.
 Ulrich Elling: Functional genomics in embryonic stem cells. Developer of Haplobank.
 Daniel Gerlich: Assembly and function of the cell division machinery.
 Anton Goloborodko: Theoretical models of chromosome structure.
 Sofia Grade: Mechanisms of plasticity after brain injury.
 Joanna Jachowicz: Dark genome in early mammalian development.
 Jürgen Knoblich: Brain development and disease. Developer of the cerebral organoid.
 Bon-Kyoung Koo: Homeostatic regulation of adult stem cells. Pioneer in adult stem cell organoids.
 Sasha Mendjan: Molecular control of human organogenesis. Developer of the human cardiac organoid.
Josef Penninger: Modeling human disease.
 Nicolas Rivron: Synthetic development. Developer of the blastoid, a complete embryo model.
 Shambaditya Saha: Macromolecular phase separation in germ cell fate.
 Noelia Urbán: Systemic regulation of adult neurogenesis.

Associated projects: The Vienna Drosophila RNAi Center (VDRC) is located at IMBA, and is available to researchers worldwide. It collects an RNAi library of over 22,000 Drosophila strains.

Major scientific discoveries 
2022. Disentanglement of the roles of condensin and histone deacetylation in chromosome assembly and chromatin compaction

2022. Identification of CLIP cells (human interneuron progenitors) as the origin of Tuberous Sclerosis using patient-derived cerebral organoids

2021. Human blastoids model blastocyst development and implantation

2021. Cardioids reveal self-organizing principles of human cardiogenesis

2020. Identification of a brain-size determinant using cerebral organoids

2020. Discovery on the conformation of sister chromatids in the replicated human genome

2019. Generation of blood vessel organoids from human pluripotent stem cells.

2017. Development of SLAM-Seq for the high-resolution assessment of RNA expression dynamics

2017. Development of a reversible haploid mouse pluripotent stem cell biobank resource for functional genomics.

2013. Generation of cerebral organoids from human pluripotent stem cells to model human brain development

2008. Discovery of an endogenous small interfering RNA pathway in Drosophila.

2005. Discovery of the role of angiotensin converting enzyme 2 (ACE2) in SARS coronavirus–induced lung injury.

History 
The institute was founded in 1999 as a joint initiative of the Austrian Academy of Sciences and Boehringer Ingelheim and with contributions from the Austrian Government and the city of Vienna. The construction of the building was initiated in 2003 and completed in 2006. It is linked to the building of the Research Institute of Molecular Pathology by a bridge so as to enhance collaborations. Both institutes share a common canteen and their scientific core facilities. In 2002, the geneticist Josef Penninger started as the Scientific Director of the IMBA and recruited Barry Dickson as the first group leader (now at Janelia Research Campus, USA). In 2007 the Vienna Drosophila RNAi Center (VDRC) opened, in collaboration with the Research Institute of Molecular Pathology. In 2018, Josef Penninger was appointed as director of the Life Science Institute of the University of British Columbia and Jürgen Knoblich took the position as interim director of the IMBA. In 2020, the institute expanded in an additional building of the Vienna Biocenter (termed VBC6).

Scientific Advisory Board 
In order to maintain the highest standard of research, the IMBA has installed a process of review and feedback led by an external Scientific Advisory Board (SAB) of internationally recognised scientists. The Board meets yearly and, together with group leaders, discusses the quality, significance, and focus of research conducted. As of December 2022, the IMBA SAB is chaired by Elaine Fuchs (The Rockefeller University) and includes Gregory Hannon (University of Cambridge, Cold Spring Harbor Laboratory), Guido Kroemer (University of Paris Descartes), Maria Leptin (President of the European Research Council ERC and Director of EMBO), Gary Ruvkun (Harvard University), and Nobel prize winner Eric Kandel.

Core scientific facilities 
Core scientific facilities within the IMBA provide services to facilitate research making use of stem cells, flies/worms, informatics, optics, molecular biology, comparative medicine, transgenics, protein chemistry, or graphic designs. These core facilities are managed by technical leaders who evaluate and implement a wide range of novel technologies and instrumentations. These professional staff scientists also train users, help with experimental design, and disseminate expert knowledge. The IMBA scientists are not billed for core services, except for certain experiment-related consumables.

Beyond the core scientific facilities of the institute, the IMBA laboratories are also financially supported to use of the core facilities of the Vienna Biocenter.

Seminar and conferences 
The IMBA acts as a forum for academic exchange through its participation to a series of weekly internal Vienna Biocenter seminars, and weekly guest lectures (termed "VBC lectures" and "Impromptus") from external, recognised or upcoming scientists.

IMBA and the IMP co-organize the yearly SY-Stem symposium focusing on the next generation of stem cell researchers.

PhD program 
The Vienna Biocenter PhD Programme is an international PhD training program carried out jointly by the four Vienna Biocenter research institutes (IMP, IMBA, GMI and Max Perutz Labs). Acceptance into the program is competitive and based on a formal selection procedure. There are two selections each year, deadlines are usually on April 30 and November 15. Participation in the program is a condition for doing a PhD at the IMBA.

Awards
The IMBA has received recognition in the form of 18 ERC grants and through awards to its researchers.

Jürgen Knoblich, current scientific director, has received the Young Investigator Award of the European Molecular Biology Organization (EMBO), the Wittgenstein Award awarded by the Austrian Ministry of Science, the Erwin Schrödinger Prize by the Austrian Academy of Sciences, and the Sir Hans Krebs Medal of the Federation of European Biochemical Societies (FEBS). He is an elected member of the Pontifical Academy of Sciences, of the Academia Europaea, of the Mathematisch-naturwissenschaftlichen Klasse of the Austrian Academy of Sciences, of the European Molecular Biology Organisation (EMBO), and is on the board of directors of the International Society for Stem Cell Research. In 2015, he was awarded both an Advanced and a Proof-of-concept European Research Council (ERC) grant.

Josef Penninger, former scientific director, has been elected as a full member of The Austrian Academy of Sciences (ÖAW). He has been awarded the Ernst Jung Prize for Medicine by the Jung-Stiftung for Science and Research, the Descartes Prize for Research by the European Commission and has received the Carus-Medal of the German Academy of Sciences Leopoldina. In 2012, Josef Penninger was awarded with the Innovator Award for his project "Novel Approaches to Breast Cancer Prevention and Inhibition of Metastases" through the US Department of Defense. In 2013 Josef Penninger received his second European Research Council’s (ERC) Advanced Investigator Grant for his research in the field of haploid stem cells.

Science communication
In collaboration with the incorporated society Dialog Gentechnik, in 2006 IMBA opened a hands-on biomolecular laboratory open to the public.

References

Biochemistry research institutes
Research institutes in Austria
Education in Vienna